Kim Jae-hoan (born 27 May 1988) is a South Korean footballer who plays as a defender for Jeonbuk Hyundai Motors.

External links 

1988 births
Living people
Association football defenders
South Korean footballers
South Korean expatriate footballers
Jeonbuk Hyundai Motors players
Hokkaido Consadole Sapporo players
Suwon FC players
K League 1 players
K League 2 players
J1 League players
South Korean expatriate sportspeople in Japan
Expatriate footballers in Japan
People from Jeonju
Sportspeople from North Jeolla Province